Sion Wiggin (born 1 September 1995) is a Welsh born New Zealand professional squash player. He achieved his highest career PSA ranking of 210 in November 2019 as a part of the 2019-20 PSA World Tour.

References

External links 
Profile at PSA

1995 births
Living people
New Zealand male squash players
Sportspeople from Cardiff